Spindizzy is an isometric computer game released for several 8-bit home computer formats in 1986 by Electric Dreams Software. It combines action and puzzle game elements. Players must navigate a series of screens to explore a landscape suspended in a three-dimensional space. Development was headed by Paul Shirley, who drew inspiration from Ultimate Play the Game games that feature an isometric projection.

The game was successful in the United Kingdom and was well received by the video game press. Reviewers praised its visuals and design, but criticized its audio. Similarities were drawn to Marble Madness, which was released in arcades two years earlier. Spindizzy was followed by a 1990s sequel titled Spindizzy Worlds.

Gameplay 

Spindizzy is an action and puzzle game played from an isometric perspective. Players can view the playing field from four angles, and rotate between them. The game takes place in a fictional landscape of interconnected stages suspended in a dimensional space. The player controls a probe called a Gyroscopic Environmental Reconnaissance And Land-Mapping Device (GERALD), via keyboard commands or a joystick. The craft is able to transform between three configurations: a ball, an inverted square pyramid, and a gyroscope, although the difference between each configuration is only visual. Players navigate the probe through the stages to explore the world within a time limit. The time limit can be extended by collecting power jewels scattered through the world and is decreased by falling off a stage. Stages feature ramps, corridors, and other obstacles that hinder the player from quickly traversing them. The game ends when time expires or the world is completely explored.

Development and release 

Spindizzy was developed by Paul Shirley of British video game developer Electric Dreams Software. He was primarily inspired by Ultimate Play the Game games that feature an isometric projection, but was also influenced by the gameplay of the 1984 arcade game Marble Madness. Shirley created an interpreted script to generate the game's levels. The script allowed him to design a large number of stages using 11KB of storage. The game was originally released for the Amstrad CPC and later ported to Apple II, Atari 8-bit, Commodore 64 and ZX Spectrum computers. Copies of Spindizzy were promoted as prizes in magazine contests upon its release. American video game company Activision published the game in the United States as part of its "Electric Dreams" series. John Sanderson programmed the Apple II version; Shirley was unaware of the port's existence until the mid-1990s. The company sold Spindizzys compilation rights not long after obtaining them, which reduced the amount of royalties to Shirley and Electric Dreams. Shirley eventually severed the contract with Activision, citing late royalty payments among other actions he disagreed with.

Reception and legacy 

Shirley described the game's marketing life as short and attributed that to Activision's business practices. James Hague of Dadgum Games commented that Spindizzy could have been an "all-time classic" had it received a proper marketing campaign. Despite this, Spindizzy sold well in the United Kingdom reaching the number one position in the Amstrad charts in March 1986. The Commodore and Spectrum versions also reached their Top 10 charts on their release several weeks later, taking the game to the number 2 position in the all formats chart.

The game was well received by video game journalists upon its release. Zzap!64 awarded Spindizzy a Gold Medal. Tony Hetherington of Computer Gamer listed it as one of the essential Spectrum titles of 1986.

Praise from reviewers focused on the game's visuals and design, while criticism focused on the audio. Three of Zzap!64s reviewers—Julian Rignall, Gary Liddon, and Gary Penn—called the graphics "amazing", well-executed, and "varied"; but they described the audio as sparse. Rignall and Penn complimented the challenging gameplay and commented that its addictiveness outweighed any frustration experienced while playing. The three summarized by urging readers to purchase the game. Computer Gamer reviewer Mike Roberts praised Spindizzys gameplay, but mentioned that the screen's orientation can require a period of adjustment, particularly when using a joystick. Crashs reviewer called Spindizzy "one of the most addictive" ZX Spectrum games, noting its innovative use of shape changing, multiple view angles, and speed control. The audio was seen as lacking compared to the rest of the game, but was still described as good. Phil South of Your Sinclair gave the game high marks for graphics, playability, value for money, and addictiveness. He praised the ability to change viewpoints and the realistic movements of the character sprite. He also lauded the speed and quality of the graphics. Info assessed the Commodore 64 version four stars out of five, recommending it as "a hot little number with much of the appeal of Marble Madness" but better. Roy Wagner reviewed the game for Computer Gaming World, stating that Spindizzy "has a lot to offer and is an excellent value."

More than a decade later, reviews still praised the game. Allgame editor Ryan Glover called Spindizzy an "innovative puzzler" that prompts players to fully explore it. Saying that the game successfully mixed infuriating moments with brilliant design, Darran Jones of Retro Gamer called Spindizzy a "timeless classic". The magazine rated Spindizzy the second best game with an isometric perspective, citing its presentation and stage designs. Reviewers drew comparisons to Marble Madness, which was ported to home platforms the same year. Roberts called Spindizzy the "best 'marble' game yet", and Charles Ardai of Computer Gaming World called it "a thoroughly enjoyable game" superior to Marble Madness. South described Spindizzy as the "closest thing yet to Marble Madness" on the ZX Spectrum, while Liddon said that any similarities to Marble Madness were coincidental. Many publications commented that the game was obviously inspired by Marble Madness. Over 25 years after its release, Retro Gamer called the game "intensely devious and addictive" and added that "Spindizzys only enemy was yourself".

Spindizzys isometric design partially inspired Glenn Corpes during the development of the 1989 title Populous. Activision released a sequel titled Spindizzy Worlds for Amiga and Atari ST computers in 1990. The game features similar gameplay, but improved graphics and larger playing fields. It was later ported to the Super Nintendo Entertainment System by ASCII, which Shirley disapproved of and considered it a "disaster". He took legal action over the span of several years to obtain royalty information and payments.

See also 
Gyroscope: A 1985 video game with similar design and gameplay
Bobby Bearing: A 1986 video game with similar design and gameplay

References 

1986 video games
Activision games
Amstrad CPC games
Apple II games
Atari 8-bit family games
Commodore 64 games
Marble games
Puzzle video games
Single-player video games
Video games developed in the United Kingdom
Video games with isometric graphics
Virtual Studio games
ZX Spectrum games